Échenoz-le-Sec is a commune in the Haute-Saône department in the region of Bourgogne-Franche-Comté in eastern France.The village of Échenoz-le-Sec belongs to the district of Vesoul and to the canton of Montbozon. The zip code of the village of Échenoz-le-Sec is 70000 and its code Insee(National Institute for Statistics and Economic Studies) is 70208.

See also
Communes of the Haute-Saône department

References

Communes of Haute-Saône